The Athletics Association of Thailand (AAT), officially known as the Athletics Association of Thailand under the Royal Patronage of His Majesty the King ) is the national governing body for Sport of athletics. It is accredited by the International Association of Athletics Federations (IAAF) which is the governing body for the sport of Athletics in the world, and the National Olympic Committee of Thailand (NOCT). It founded in 1948.  

The association is headquartered in Khlong Luang, Pathum Thani. The current head of the federation is Pol.Col. Sant Sarutanond.

References
Athletics Association of Thailand 

National members of the Asian Athletics Association
Athletics in Thailand
Athletics